Sugarloaf Island is a conspicuous small island which lies close to the east side of Clarence Island, midway between Cape Lloyd and Cape Bowles, in the South Shetland Islands, Antarctica.  It lies 3.2 km north of Lebed Point, on the northern side of the entrance to Istros Bay. The name was in use by American and British sealers as early as 1822 and is now well established.

Important Bird Area
An 82 ha site, comprising all of Sugarloaf Island, the neighbouring ice-free coastal area of Clarence Island and the intervening marine area, has been designated an Important Bird Area (IBA) by BirdLife International because it supports a total of about 70,000 pairs of chinstrap penguins, as well as some 25,000 pairs of southern fulmars on the adjacent ice-free slopes of Clarence Island.

Maps
British Antarctic Territory. Scale 1:200000 topographic map. DOS 610 Series, Sheet W 61 54. Directorate of Overseas Surveys, Tolworth, UK, 1972.
South Shetland Islands: Elephant, Clarence and Gibbs Islands. Scale 1:220000 topographic map. UK Antarctic Place-names Committee, 2009.
Antarctic Digital Database (ADD). Scale 1:250000 topographic map of Antarctica. Scientific Committee on Antarctic Research (SCAR). Since 1993, regularly upgraded and updated.

References

Sugarloaf Island. SCAR Composite Gazetteer of Antarctica.

Important Bird Areas of Antarctica
Seabird colonies
Penguin colonies
Islands of the South Shetland Islands